Monica Drake (born 1967 in Lansing, Michigan) is an American fiction writer known for her novels, Clown Girl and The Stud Book.  Clown Girl was a finalist for the 2007 Ken Kesey Award for the Novel through the Oregon Book Awards. It was named Best Book of 2007 by Fight Club author Chuck Palahniuk in the December 2007 issue of Playboy Magazine.

Actress and comedian Kristen Wiig optioned the film rights for Clown Girl.

The Stud Book gained attention for its "dead girl shots game" and the author's commentary "about the way the dead bodies of women have become such a popular television trope." The Oregonian characterized the novel as "mesmerizing" despite "off-putting" qualities and a slow start.

Drake lives in Portland, Oregon with her daughter Mavis Drake-Alonso. She is among the faculty in the writing program at Pacific Northwest College of Art and a graduate of the University of Arizona's MFA program in creative writing.

In 2018, Drake appeared on Storytellers Telling Stories, reading from her newest book, The Folly of Loving Life, accompanied by singer-songwriter, Katelyn Convery.

References

External links 
 Author’s Homepage

21st-century American novelists
Writers from Detroit
1967 births
Living people
University of Arizona alumni
Writers from Portland, Oregon
American women novelists
21st-century American women writers
Novelists from Michigan
Novelists from Oregon